This bibliography lists publications authored by the Italian malacologist and painter Carlo Pollonera (1849-1923). The article endeavours to be comprehensive, and includes all works listed in previous bibliographies of Pollonera. Zoological Record and AnimalBase have also been utilised. Works listed without an internet link have generally not been examined directly. Dates given here follow those printed on the individual issue wrappers (where these were available to inspect or where there were other reliable sources), which sometimes differ from those on the title page of the volume.

The last section considers some works to which Pollonera contributed without being an author; this part of the list is far more likely not to be comprehensive.

Non-scientific publications

Scientific publications

  [Reprinted as Lessona & Pollonera 1884.]
 [Reprint of Lessona & Pollonera  1882.]

 [pp. 412–432 in some copies.]

 [pp. 409–426 in some copies.]
 [pp. 675–703 in some copies.]

  [Listed as appearing in 1887 on authority of Guasco and others; the volume is dated 1886]
 [Guasca and AnimalBase give publication date as 1887; the volume is dated 1886]

I. Molluschi della Valle del Natisone (Friuli)

II. Mongrafia degli Sphyradium italinani

III. Degli Odontocyclas italiani

 [pp. 290–313 in some copies.]

I. Di alcume testacelle raccolte presso Torino

II Di alcume testacelle spagnole

III. Un nuovo limacide dell'Asia Minore

 [pp. 623–640 in some copies.]
 [For errata see Volume 5 Issue 79]
 ["Macologia" really is written in the original title.]

IV. Un nuovo Zospeum italiano

V. Acme italiane del gruppo delle costulatae

VI. Vitrina stabilei e V. maior

VII. La Xerophila submaritima Desmoul. in Italia

V. Un limacide nuovo per l'Italia

VI. Una nuova stazione del Limax corsicus

 [See comment on 1893 article with similar title.]

[Both Zoological Record and earlier bibliographies list this article, but it has not proved possible to trace the journal. Zoological Record states that it describes the same new species as does Pollonera's article with the same title from 1891, so it may be a reprinted version.]

IX. Sui limacidi della Corsica

X. Un nuovo limacide della Toscana. Agriolimax Cecconii, n. sp.

I. Intorno a due nuove specie di Acameidae

II. Molluschi terrestri e fluviatili delle Isole d'Elba e Pianosa

III. Sulla Cochlicella contermina Shuttleworth

IV. Sui Limacidi della Siria e della Palestina

V. Sull'Agriolimax panormintanus

Sul genere Oopelta

VII. Due forme misconosciute di Zonites italiani

VIII. Una nuova Tacheocampylaea dell'Isola di Capraia

 [The second half of the paper is an additional note written by Pallary.]

Additional works

Pollonera is given as the authority of some species descriptions in the following two publications by Caziot. Although this implies that he wrote most of the description, according to the current ICZN code the authority should nevertheless be considered as Caziot alone.

 [See p. 120.]

Pollonera also sometimes drew the plates for the publications of colleagues. Listed below are two examples, but there are liable to be others.

Pollonera was a successful painter, so his paintings have appeared in various books and articles. The following are celebrations of this aspect of his work that include illustrations. The last of these (Picco, 1998) includes in his listing of 305 of Pollonera's paintings instances of where each work has been reproduced or exhibited.

References

Bibliographies by writer
Bibliographies of Italian writers